Le Bardo (  also Bārdaw, Bardaw, and Bardois) is a Tunisian city west of Tunis. As of 2004, the population is 73,953.

Built by the Hafsid dynasty in the 14th century, the name Bardo comes from the Spanish word "prado" meaning a garden. Bardo became a residence of the Tunis court in the 18th century. With the arrival of Husseinite beys, Bardo became a political, intellectual and religious center. The ancient beys' residence was the site of the Tunisian National Assembly headquarters, and the National Museum opened there in 1888.

The city gave its name to the Treaty of Bardo, signed in nearby Ksar Saïd Palace, which placed Tunisia under a French protectorate in May 1881.

External links

Populated places in Tunis Governorate
Communes of Tunisia